Nooa Takooa (born 10 March 1993) is a sprinter who is internationally representing Kiribati. He participated in 2009 World Championships in Athletics and 2010 Summer Youth Olympics. He represented Kiribati at 2012 Summer Olympics in London in the Men's 100m event. Takooa was eliminated in the preliminary round but finished with a personal best time of 11.53. Takooa is a member of the Church of Jesus Christ of Latter-day Saints.

Personal bests
Outdoor
100 m: 11.51 s (wind: -0.1 m/s) –  Papeete, 5 June 2013
Indoor
60 m: 7.57 s –  Istanbul, 9 March 2012

Achievements

References

External links
 
Sports reference biography

1993 births
Living people
I-Kiribati male sprinters
Athletes (track and field) at the 2010 Summer Youth Olympics
Athletes (track and field) at the 2012 Summer Olympics
Olympic athletes of Kiribati
I-Kiribati Latter Day Saints
Athletes (track and field) at the 2014 Commonwealth Games
Commonwealth Games competitors for Kiribati
World Athletics Championships athletes for Kiribati
People from the Gilbert Islands
Table tennis players at the 2018 Commonwealth Games